Robert J. Lang Jr. House is a historic home located near Fountain, Pitt County, North Carolina. It was built about 1870, and is a one-story, three-bay, double pile Greek Revival / Italianate style frame dwelling.  It is sheathed in clapboard siding, has a gable roof, and a detached rear kitchen wing.  It features a nearly full-width hipped roof front porch and flanking stuccoed brick chimneys.

It was listed on the National Register of Historic Places in 1990.

References

Houses on the National Register of Historic Places in North Carolina
Greek Revival houses in North Carolina
Italianate architecture in North Carolina
Houses completed in 1870
Houses in Pitt County, North Carolina
National Register of Historic Places in Pitt County, North Carolina